Les Cheneaux Islands are a group of 36 small islands, some inhabited, along 12 miles of Lake Huron shoreline on the southeastern tip of the Upper Peninsula of Michigan in the United States. The name is French for "the Channels", noting the many channels between the islands in the group. They are about 30 miles northeast of Mackinac Island and about 35 miles south of Sault Ste. Marie. The islands are a popular resort and boating and kayaking area. The nearby communities of Hessel and Cedarville on the mainland offer marinas, camping, lodging, restaurants, and shopping. The Les Cheneaux Islands Antique Boat Show & Festival of the Arts has been held on the second Saturday of each August since 1976 in Hessel. It is the world's largest antique wooden boat show.

Overview of Area
The named islands include:
Alligator Island
Bear Island
Birch Island
Boot Island
Burnham Island
Coryell Island
Cove Island
Crow Island
Dollar Island
Echo Island
Eagle Island
Goat Island
Goose Island
Government Island, federally owned, administered through Hiawatha National Forest, primitive campground
Gravelly Island
Haven Island
Hill Island, connected by causeway and bridge with the mainland
Holsinger Island
Island No. 8, connected by bridge with the mainland via Hill Island
La Salle Island
Little Island (Also known as "Skunk Island" to locals)
Little Joe's Island (Also known as White Loon Island)
Little La Salle Island
Lone Susan Island
Long Island
Marquette Island, the largest of all 36 islands
Penny Island
Rodger Island
Rover Island
St. Ledger Island
Strongs Island
Winona Island

The island chain forms many bays, harbors, and inland lakes, including:
Bass Cove Lake
Bush Bay
Cedarville Bay
Duck Bay
Flower Bay
Government Bay
Mackinac Bay
Marquette Bay
McKay Bay
Melchers Bay
Mismer Bay
Muscallonge Bay
Peck Bay
Prentiss Bay
Sand Bay
Scammons Harbor
Sheppard Bay
Urie Bay
Voight Bay
Wilderness Bay

From Lake Huron, there are four major entrances to access the islands:
East Entrance (Between Boot Island and Strongs Island)
Middle Entrance (Between Marquette Island and Little La Salle Island)
West Entrance (between Point Brulee and Marquette Island, main entrance to Hessel)
The fourth entrance, though unnamed on official charts, is often known as "Yacht Entrance," named for the many yachts that access Government Bay for overnight anchorage.

Les Cheneaux Ensign Class: Fleet 31

The Les Cheneaux Islands are home to Fleet 31 of the Ensign Class.  The fleet sails out of the Les Cheneaux Yacht Club  located on Marquette Island.  It is the largest fleet of ensigns worldwide, featuring 64 boats sailing as of summer 2008.  Fleet 31  hosted the 2008 Ensign Class Region V Championships on July 10–12, 2008.  Fleet 31 was selected by the Ensign Class Association to host the National Ensign Regatta in 2010.

References

External links
Les Cheneaux Welcome Center
Les Cheneaux Chamber of Commerce
Les Cheneaux Ensign Class Fleet 31
Les Cheneaux Watershed Council

Islands of Lake Huron in Michigan
Islands of Mackinac County, Michigan
Tourist attractions in Mackinac County, Michigan